Woodlawn cemetery, consisting of , is a cemetery located in Las Vegas, Nevada that is listed on the United States National Register of Historic Places. It is owned by the City of Las Vegas and is a stop on the city's "Pioneer Trail". It houses the Veterans Circle that commemorates the service and sacrifice of Nevada veterans.

History
The cemetery was listed in the National Register of Historic Places on November 21, 1968. It is located at Las Vegas Blvd and Owens.

Interments
 William H. Briare (1930–2006), mayor of Las Vegas
Frank Cullotta, mobster
"Nick the Greek" Dandolos, gambler
"Diamondfield" Jack Davis, gunfighter and prospector
Mark Fator, 1922 American National Champion jockey
 Billy Guy (1936–2002), musician
 Chubby Johnson (1903–1974), movie actor
 Rhoshii Wells (1976–2008), boxer

References

External links
 

Cemeteries on the National Register of Historic Places in Nevada
National Register of Historic Places in Las Vegas
1914 establishments in Nevada